Bass Communion is a solo project of English musician Steven Wilson, best known for his lead role in the rock band Porcupine Tree. Records released under the name "Bass Communion" are in an ambient or electronic vein - lengthy drone-heavy compositions. They come about as experiments in texture made from processing the sound of real instruments and field recordings.

Bass Communion's albums have often featured collaborations from other musicians, including Robert Fripp of King Crimson, saxophonist Theo Travis, Bryn Jones (also known as Muslimgauze), and Vidna Obmana.

History 

Bass Communion has origins in Steven Wilson's earliest work as a musician. Taking influence from German experimental electronic music artist such as Tangerine Dream, Klaus Schulze, Conrad Schnitzler, Wilson, along with childhood friend Simon Vockings, formed the group Altamont in 1983. Wilson and Vockings experimented with primitive analog synthesizers, recording the performances live, without the use of multitracking. These recordings were compiled on the tape Prayer for the Soul in September 1983 and released on the Acid Tapes label, then run by future Imaginary Records boss, Alan Duffy.

By the 1990s, Wilson began to notice an increasing amount of music inspired by the same experimental artists who inspired Altamont. Hearing artists such as Paul Schutze and Biosphere, Wilson felt that it was an ideal time to revisit experimental electronic music. The first self-titled Bass Communion album, often referred to as Bass Communion I, was released in April 1998.

Discography

Studio albums 
 I (1998)
 II (1999)
 III (2001)
 Ghosts on Magnetic Tape (2004)
 Indicates Void (2005)
 Loss (2006)
 Pacific Codex (2008)
 Molotov and Haze (2008)
 Chiaroscuro (2009)
 Cenotaph (2011)
 And No Birds Sing (2021)

Remix albums 
 Bass Communion (Reconstructions and Recycling) (2003)
 Jonathan Coleclough / Bass Communion / Colin Potter (2003)

Compilations 
 Atmospherics (1999)
 Untitled (Bass Communion Box) (2014)
 Remixed by BC: 2003-2009 (2019)

Singles and EPs
 Vajrayana (2004)
 Dronework (2005)
 Haze Shrapnel (2008)
 Headwind/Tailwind (2009)
 Litany (2009)
 Sisters Oregon (2017)

Collaborations 
 Bass Communion V Muslimgauze (1999)
 Continuum 1 (2005)
 Continuum 2 (2007)
 Bass Communion / Pig - Live in Mexico City (2008)
 Bass Communion/Freiband (2017)
 Precision Surgery Inversions (2018)

Remix albums 
The Continuum Recyclings, Volume One (2006)
The Continuum Recyclings, Volume Two (2010)

See also 
List of ambient music artists

References

External links 
Bass Communion Page
Bass Communion at AllMusic
Bass Communion at last.fm
Burning Shed Records

English electronic music groups
Soleilmoon artists
Drone music groups
Coup Sur Coup Records artists